The Kahlil Gibran Memorial Garden is a public garden located at 3100 Massachusetts Avenue, N.W. Washington, D.C., "within a wooded ravine known as Woodland-Normanstone Park". At its center are a bronze sculpture of the Lebanese-American writer, poet and visual artist Kahlil Gibran by Gordon Kray and a star-shaped fountain surrounded by limestone benches engraved with quotes of Gibran.

The memorial garden was dedicated on May 24, 1991, by President George H. W. Bush. The fundraising was organized by the Kahlil Gibran Centennial Foundation, formed to celebrate the 100th anniversary of the poet's birth in Bsharri.

References

External links
Khalil Gibran Sculpture, Washington DC: photo by rachaelvoorhees, February 19, 2011
Khalil Gibran Memorial Garden Located at 3100 Mass. Ave, NW. popville.com, November 11, 2009 
A Garden for Gibran. Larry Luxner, Aramco World

1991 establishments in Washington, D.C.
1991 sculptures
Artworks in the collection of the National Park Service
Bronze sculptures in Washington, D.C.
Gibran
Monuments and memorials in Washington, D.C.
Outdoor sculptures in Washington, D.C.
Sculptures of men in Washington, D.C.
Kahlil Gibran